Paston Coke (born 23 August 1971) is a Jamaican sprinter. He was born in St. James, one of the western parishes of Jamaica. Paston competes in 100M, 200m and 400M dash. He won the silver medal in the 400 metres at 1999 World Student Games in personal record of 45.15 seconds. He was a member of Jamaica 4 x 400 metres relay team that won bronze medal in at the 1999 IAAF World outdoor Championships and gold medal at the 1999 Pan American Games. Paston competed at the NCAA II for New York Institute of Technology where he won two individual 400m titles and three relay titles. Paston has taken his running abilities and turned it into becoming a Professional Electrical Engineer (PE).

References

1971 births
Jamaican male sprinters
Living people
People from Saint James Parish, Jamaica
Athletes (track and field) at the 1999 Pan American Games
Pan American Games medalists in athletics (track and field)
Pan American Games gold medalists for Jamaica
Universiade medalists in athletics (track and field)
New York Institute of Technology alumni
Universiade silver medalists for Jamaica
Medalists at the 1999 Summer Universiade
Medalists at the 1999 Pan American Games
20th-century Jamaican people
21st-century Jamaican people